William Whitney Talman Jr., (February 4, 1915August 30, 1968) was an American television and movie actor, best known for playing Los Angeles District Attorney Hamilton Burger in the television series Perry Mason.

Family and education
William Talman was born in Detroit, Michigan, to Ada Barber and William Whitney Talman, a vice president of an electronics company. His maternal grandparents, Catherine Gandy and James Wells Barber, were immigrants from England.

Talman founded the drama club at the Cranbrook Kingswood School in Bloomfield Hills, Michigan. He continued to act at Dartmouth College and the University of Michigan. After college, he worked in summer stock and at an iron foundry, paper mills, boat yards, and as an automobile salesman. Talman served for 30 months in the United States Army in the Pacific Theatre of World War II, beginning his service as a private on February 4, 1942, at Camp Upton in Yaphank, Long Island, New York. He was ultimately commissioned a major during the war.

Acting career

Talman began his acting career on the stage. He was the leading man in the summer stock company at Ivoryton, Connecticut, where he met his first wife, and he played the male lead in Dear Ruth during part of the play's New York run. He appeared on Broadway in Beverly Hills, Spring Again and A Young Man's Fancy, and toured with the road companies of Yokel Boy and Of Mice and Men.

William Talman quickly established himself as a villain in motion pictures. His breakthrough role was in director Richard Fleischer's 1950 film noir thriller Armored Car Robbery, inspired by the Great Brink's Robbery. Talman played the leading role of a career criminal, acknowledged as a genius in gangland circles, who painstakingly masterminded the armored car robbery of the title. In the 1952 film Beware, My Lovely, in which Ida Lupino played a war widow terrorized by a madman in her home, a photograph of Talman was used for the picture of her late, heroic husband.

In 1953, Talman played a sadistic, psychopathic killer in a movie directed by Lupino, the film noir The Hitch-Hiker. The New York Times wrote, "William Talman, as the ruthless murderer, makes the most of one of the year's juiciest assignments."

His performance was also noted by Gail Patrick Jackson, executive producer of the CBS-TV series Perry Mason (1957–66). Raymond Burr had initially auditioned for the role of Mason's adversary, Los Angeles district attorney Hamilton Burger, but Patrick encouraged Burr to lose 60 pounds and read for the lead role – which Burr successfully did. Patrick already had an actor in mind for the district attorney: "I'd seen a brilliant little movie, The Hitch-Hiker, and had to have Bill Talman as Burger – and he never disappointed us," Patrick said.

In 1958, a journalist asked Talman how he felt about Burger losing to Mason week after week. Talman said, "Burger doesn't lose. How can a district attorney lose when he fails to convict an innocent person? Unlike a fist or gun fight, in court you can have a winner without having a loser. As a matter of fact, Burger in a good many instances has joined Mason in action against unethical attorneys, lying witnesses, or any one else obstructing justice. Like any real-life district attorney, justice is Burger's main interest."

Talman, as Burger, went on to lose all but three cases in the nine-year series, including a record two separate murder trials in the final episode. He called his record "the longest losing streak in history". Talman had the title role in the 1960 episode "The Case of the Prudent Prosecutor" in which Burger disqualified himself from prosecuting a longtime personal friend, Jefferson Pike, who was accused of murder. At the end of the episode, after Pike was cleared by Mason, Burger said, "You know, I think I won this case."

Aside from his major supporting role in Perry Mason, Talman also guest-starred in various television series, including Wagon Train, Have Gun-Will Travel, Cimarron City, and Gunsmoke. After the 1966 cancellation of Perry Mason, Talman appeared on The Wild, Wild West and in a first-season episode of The Invaders, "Quantity: Unknown”, which was his last on-screen acting role before his death.

Arrest for narcotics and lewd vagrancy 
Talman was fired from Perry Mason for a short period in 1960. Sheriff's deputies, suspicious of marijuana use, raided a party on March 13, 1960, in the West Hollywood apartment of Richard Reibold, an advertising agency executive. The deputies reported finding Talman and seven other defendants variously naked and partly dressed. Among the guests was Mrs. Peggy Louise Flannigan, who would later become William Talman's next wife, after his divorce from Barbara Read.

All were arrested for possession of marijuana (the charge was later dropped) and lewd vagrancy. On June 17, municipal judge Adolph Alexander dismissed the charges of lewd vagrancy against Talman and the others for lack of proof. "I don't approve of their conduct," the judge ruled, "but it is not for you and me to approve but to enforce the statutes." Despite this Talman was fired by CBS, which refused to give a reason. Talman was later rehired after the series's executive producer, Gail Patrick Jackson, staunchly supported by Talman's friend Raymond Burr, made a request to CBS after a massive campaign of letters from viewers.

Personal life
Talman was married three times. His first marriage, to actress Lynne Carter, lasted from just before he left for active service in 1942 to September 1952 and produced one daughter, Lynda. His second wife was actress Barbara Read; she had two sons, Damon and Quentin, from her second marriage. Read and Talman were married in 1953 and had one daughter, Barbie, and one son, William Whitney Talman III. The couple divorced on August 23, 1960. Talman's third wife was Margaret Louise Larkin Flannigan, whom he married in 1963; she had a son, Steve, and daughter, Debbie, from a previous marriage. The couple had two children: a son, Timothy, and a daughter, Susan. Margaret Talman outlived William Talman by almost 34 years and died, of lung cancer related to smoking, in January 2002, at age 73.

Antismoking advocacy and death
Talman is also known for being the first actor in Hollywood to film an antismoking public service announcement for the American Cancer Society. A lifelong heavy smoker, he was diagnosed with lung cancer, and knew he was dying when he filmed the commercial. The short film began with the words: "Before I die, I want to do what I can to leave a world free of cancer for my six children [...]" Talman requested that the commercial not be aired until after his death.

He had made another such public service announcement, which opened with his voice-over and a picture of his home, followed by filmed shots of his wife and kids, then a still of himself "with a friend of mine you might recognize," Raymond Burr, from the Perry Mason TV series. He then said, "You know, I didn't really mind losing those courtroom battles, but I'm in a battle now I don't want to lose at all. Because if I lose it, it means losing my wife and those kids you just met. I've got lung cancer... So take some advice about smoking and losing from someone who's been doing both for years... If you don't smoke, don't start. If you do smoke, quit!.... Don't be a loser."

Four weeks after filming the second public service announcement, Talman died of lung cancer (which had metastasized to his liver, bones and brain) on August 30, 1968, at the age of 53, and was buried in the Court of Liberty, lot 833, at Forest Lawn Memorial Park (Hollywood Hills) in Los Angeles.

Theatre credits

Filmography

Notes

References

External links

 
 
 
When TV D.A. William Talman Got Busted For Narcotics and Lewd Vagrancy at Invisible Themepark

1915 births
1968 deaths
American male film actors
American male television actors
Cranbrook Educational Community alumni
American people of English descent
Deaths from lung cancer in California
Male actors from Detroit
Burials at Forest Lawn Memorial Park (Hollywood Hills)
20th-century American male actors
Anti-smoking activists
Dartmouth College alumni
University of Michigan alumni
United States Army personnel of World War II
American health activists
United States Army officers